UK usually refers to the United Kingdom, a country in Europe.

UK, U.K., Uk, or uk may also refer to:

Arts and media
 U.K. (band), a progressive rock supergroup
 U.K. (album), by U.K.
 UK Records, a record label

Educational institutions
 Charles University, in Prague, Czech Republic
 Comenius University, in Bratislava, Slovakia
 Kongo University, in the Democratic Republic of the Congo
 Universidad Argentina John F. Kennedy, Argentina
 University of Kara, Togo
 University of Kashmir, India
 University of Kentucky, United States or its athletic program, the Kentucky Wildcats
 University of Kragujevac, Serbia

Language
 Uk (Cyrillic), a digraph in early Cyrillic alphabet
 uk, the Ukrainian language's ISO 639-1 code
  or World Congress of Esperanto

Places
 Uttarakhand, a state of India
 Uk, an urban-type settlement in Irkutsk Oblast, Russia

Other uses
 .uk, the United Kingdom's top-level Internet domain
 UK (ICAO airport codes), airports in Ukraine
 Vistara (IATA airline code UK)

See also
 United Kingdom (disambiguation)